Lehnice is a village and municipality in the Dunajská Streda District in the Trnava Region of south-west Slovakia.

Component villages

Geography
The municipality lies at an altitude of 121 metres and covers an area of 25.338 km².

History
In the 9th century, the territory of Lehnice became part of the Kingdom of Hungary. The name of the municipality was first recorded in 1239 by its Hungarian name as Legu. Until the end of World War I, all the present-day component villages of the municipality were part of Hungary and fell within the Somorja district of Pozsony County. After the Austro-Hungarian army disintegrated in November 1918, Czechoslovak troops occupied the area. After the Treaty of Trianon of 1920, the area became officially part of Czechoslovakia. In November 1938, the First Vienna Award granted the area to Hungary and it was held by Hungary until 1945. In 1940, three neighboring villages were unified to form Lég municipality. After Soviet occupation in 1945, Czechoslovak administration returned and the village became officially part of Czechoslovakia in 1947. In 1960, Masníkovo (Előpatony) was also attached to the municipality.

Demography 
At the 2001 Census the recorded population of the village was 2409 while an end-2008 estimate by the Statistical Office had the villages's population as 2540. As of 2001, 68.87% of its population (1659 residents) were Hungarians while 26.86% (647 residents) were Slovaks. Roman Catholicism is the majority religion of the village, its adherents numbering 87.26% of the total population.

Twinnings 
The village is twinned with:
  Répcelak, Hungary

References 

Villages and municipalities in Dunajská Streda District
Hungarian communities in Slovakia